Fudōin-mae Station is a HRT station on Astram Line, located in 3–3–12, Ushita-shinmachi, Naka-ku, Hiroshima.

Platforms

Bus services connections

Intercity express bus

Hiroshima Airport Limousine bus

Hiroshima Prefecture Internal express bus

Suburban bus

Local bus
Hiroden Bus
Chugoku JR Bus
Hiroshima Bus
Geiyo Bus
Hiroshima Kotsu

Around station
Fudō-in
Hijiyama University
Hiroshima Municipal Hiroshima Commercial High School
Human Welfare Hiroshima College
Hiroshima Ushita-shinmachi Post Office

History
Opened on August 20, 1994.

See also
Astram Line
Hiroshima Rapid Transit

References

Astram Line stations
Railway stations in Japan opened in 1994